"De Vez En Mes" is a written by Guatemalan singer-songwriter Ricardo Arjona for his tenth Studio album, Adentro (2005). The song was released on April 7, 2005, as the fourth single from the album.

Composition
"De Vez En Mes" is a Latin pop ballad song written by Arjona. It was produced by Arjona with Dan Warner, Lee Levin and additional help from Tommy Torres. The lyrics of the song are related to a woman's menstruation. The song received negative response due to its theme, on which the singer commented that the song had "the most beautiful lyrics from Adentro", further stating that "more than hit me, they [the criticism] saddens me." He also stated that "criticism is a symptom of envy."

Music video 
The music video was shot in black and white and features a woman who is seen on places inside a house throughout the video.

Trackslisting

Charts

Release history

References 

2005 songs
2006 singles
Ricardo Arjona songs
Songs written by Ricardo Arjona
Sony BMG Norte singles